This is a list of streets in the Brussels-Capital Region, Belgium:
 Boulevard Adolphe Max
 Rue d'Aerschot
 Avenue Albert
 Chaussée d'Alsemberg
 Boulevard Anspach
 Rue Antoine Dansaert
 Boulevard Auguste Reyers
 Rue du Bailli
 Rue Belliard
 Boulevard Brand Whitlock
 Avenue Brugmann
 Boulevard du Centenaire
 Chaussée de Charleroi
 Avenue Charles Quint
 Avenue des Croix du Feu
 Avenue De Fré
 Boulevard de Smet de Naeyer
 Boulevard Edmond Machtens
 Boulevard Emile Jacqmain
 Boulevard de l'Empereur
 Avenue de l'Exposition
 Avenue de l'Exposition Universelle
 Avenue Fonsny
 Avenue Franklin Roosevelt
 Chaussée de Gand
 Boulevard Général Jacques
 Boulevard Général Wahis
 Chaussée de Haecht
 Avenue Houba de Strooper
 Boulevard de l'Impératrice
 Boulevard Industriel
 Chaussée d'Ixelles
 Avenue de Jette
 Chaussée de Jette
 Chaussée de La Hulpe
 Boulevard Lambermont
 Boulevard Lépold II
 Avenue Léopold III
 Rue de la Loi
 Boulevard Louis Mettewie
 Boulevard Louis Schmidt
 Avenue Louise
 Chaussée de Louvain
 Boulevard Maurice Lemonnier
 Rue du Marché aux Fromages
 Rue du Midi
 Chaussée de Mons
 Rue Neuve
 Chaussée de Ninove
 Boulevard Pachéco
 Boulevard Paepsem
 Avenue du Parc
 Avenue du Parc Royal
 Boulevard de la Plaine
 Boulevard Prince de Liège
 Avenue de la Reine
 Avenue de Roodebeek
 Rue Royale
 Boulevard Saint-Michel
 Boulevard du Souverain
 Rue de Stalle
 Boulevard Sylvain Dupuis
 Avenue de Tervueren
 Boulevard du Triomphe
 Quai des Usines
 Avenue Van Praet
 Avenue Van Volxem
 Rue Victor Hugo
 Avenue de Vilvorde
 Chaussée de Vleurgat
 Chaussée de Waterloo
 Chaussée de Wavre
 Avenue Wielemans Ceuppens
 Avenue Winston Churchill
 Boulevard de la Woluwe

 
Brussels
Streets In Brussels
Streets
Brussels